Goşşi or Goshi ( [];  or ) is an abandoned village in the Larnaca District of Cyprus, about 15 km north-west of Larnaca. It was originally inhabited exclusively by Turkish Cypriots. Nearly all of them were displaced during the 1974 Turkish invasion; most resettled in Exometochi. In 1973, Goşşi had an estimated population of 244. It is now the location of a Greek-Cypriot army camp.

References

Turkish Cypriot villages depopulated after the 1974 Turkish invasion of Cyprus